Shushā Guppy (née Shamsi Assār (24 December 1935 – 21 March 2008) was a writer, editor and a singer of Persian and Western folk songs. She lived in London from the early 1960s, until her death in 2008.

Early life 
Her father, Sayyed Mohammad-Kāzem Assār, was a Shia theologian and Professor of Philosophy at University of Tehran. At age 16 in 1951, Shusha was sent to Paris, where she studied French Literature and philosophy at Sorbonne, and also trained as an opera singer. In Paris she encountered artists, writers and poets such as Louis Aragon, José Bergamín, Jean-Paul Sartre and Albert Camus. She was encouraged by Jacques Prévert to record an album of Persian folk songs.

She married British writer, explorer, and art collector Nicholas Guppy in 1961. The couple had two sons, Darius and Constantine, but divorced in 1976. At the time of her marriage she moved to London, where she became fluent in English; she was already fluent in Persian and French. Guppy wrote articles for major publications in both Britain and the United States. She also began singing and acting professionally.

Singer
Guppy's first British release, in 1971, was an album of traditional Persian music, complementing her first album released in France fourteen years earlier.

By now, influenced by the Folk Revival, she was writing and singing some of her own songs, as well as covering the works of many contemporary singer-songwriters. She gave successful concerts in Britain, America and continental Europe, and appeared on television and radio programmes.

She gave concerts in the Netherlands and Belgium in 1975 with Lori Lieberman and Dimitri van Toren.

She contributed music (in collaboration with G.T. Moore) and narrated the 1973 documentary film Bakhtiari Migration – The sheep must live, which, in 1976, was more than doubled in length and her narration replaced by one by actor James Mason. It was released as People of the Wind. The following year the film was nominated for the Best Documentary Feature Oscar and also for a Golden Globe. The film follows the annual migration of the nomadic Bakhtiari tribes in southern Iran. The soundtrack was later released in the USA. How much she contributed to the film is in dispute.

According to Shusha Guppy herself: "What has saddened me, and frankly made me angry, is not the money — as I said I wanted to make the film and financial rewards were not my aim — but the fact that all the credits were taken from me on People of the Wind of which the idea, the production, and the text were mine."

Discography 
All are vinyl LPs except where noted. The years given are for the first release.

Chansons d'Amour Persanes (7-inch EP 1957)
Persian Love Songs and Mystic Chants (1971)
Song of Long-time Lovers (1972)
Shusha (1974)
This is the Day (1974)
Before the Deluge (1975)
People of the Wind (1977)
From East to West (1978)
Here I Love You (1980)
La Fortune (1980 – cassette)
Lovely in the Dances: Songs of Sydney Carter (1981)
Durable Fire (1983)
Strange Affair (1986)
Refugee (1995 – CD on Sharrow Records)
Shusha / This is the Day (2001 – reissue on CD)

Writer and editor

Guppy promoted Persian culture and history, and was a political commentator on relations between the West and the Islamic world. Guppy's first book, The Blindfold Horse: Memoirs of a Persian Childhood, was published in 1988. It was highly praised, winning the Yorkshire Post Prize from the Royal Society of Literature, the Winifred Holtby Memorial Prize, and the Grand prix des lectrices de Elle.

The book describes a Persia before the excesses of Shah Reza Pahlavi led to his overthrow, describing a country with an Islamic way of life without dogmatism or fanaticism. Her last book, The Secret of Laughter (2005), is a collection of Persian fairy tales from Iran's oral tradition. Many had never previously been published in written form. For twenty years, until 2005, she was the London editor of the American literary journal The Paris Review.

Bibliography
The Blindfold Horse: Memories of a Persian Childhood, William Heinemann Ltd, 1988, ; I B Tauris & Co Ltd, 2004, .
Journeys in Persia and Kurdistan: Vol 2, by Isabella L. Bird with introduction by Shusha Guppy, Virago Press, 1989, .
A Girl in Paris, William Heinemann Ltd, 1991, ; I B Tauris & Co Ltd, 2007, .
Looking Back: A Panoramic View of a Literary Age by the Grandes Dames of European Letters, with introduction by Anita Brookner, Simon & Schuster Ltd, 1992, .
On the Death of a Parent, Shusha Guppy et al., ed. Jane McLoughlin, Virago Press, 1994, .
One Thousand and One Persian-English Proverbs, eds. Simin Habibian, Shusha Guppy et al. Ibex Publishing, 1995, .
Three Journeys in the Levant: Jordan, Syria, Lebanon, Starhaven, 2001, .
The Secret of Laughter: Magical Tales from Classical Persia, I B Tauris & Co Ltd, 2005, .

See also
 Music of Iran
 List of Iranian musicians

References 

Shusha, Discography

External links
 [ Shusha Guppy] at Allmusic
 Shusha Guppy speaks in the documentary film on Omar Khayyām, Intoxicating Rhymes and Sobering Wine,  (1 min).
 Shusha Guppy on her return to Iran, Woman's Hour, BBC Radio 4, 16 March 2006.  (8 min 35 sec).
 Shusha Guppy, School of Illumination, Sunday Feature, 45 minutes, BBC Radio 3, Sunday 19 March 2006, . Note: At present BBC offers no audio recording or a transcript of this programme. The website presents however an extensive bibliography.
 Shusha Guppy, 'The Book of Kings' published in Parnassus, Vol. 30.
 Shusha Guppy's song, Natalya, referred to in the obituary of Natalya Gorbanevskaya.

1935 births
2008 deaths
20th-century Iranian women singers
English folk singers
Iranian folk singers
English women singer-songwriters
English documentary filmmakers
Iranian emigrants to the United Kingdom
Singers from Tehran
Burials at Behesht-e Zahra
University of Paris alumni
Iranian memoirists
English women writers
Iranian women writers
20th-century English women singers
20th-century English singers
Women memoirists
Women documentary filmmakers
20th-century memoirists